A gulch is a deep V-shaped valley formed by erosion.

Gulch or The Gulch may also refer to:

 Gulch (horse), a thoroughbred horse
 The Gulch (Atlanta), a redevelopment district in Atlanta, Georgia
 The Gulch (Nashville), a neighborhood in Nashville, Tennessee